Azygopterus is a monotypic genus of marine ray-finned fish belonging to the family Eulophiidae, the spinous eelpouts. Its only species is Azygopterus corallinus which is found in the northwestern Pacific Ocean.

References

Fish described in 1955
Eulophiidae
Monotypic ray-finned fish genera